A basic helix–loop–helix (bHLH) is a protein structural motif that characterizes one of the largest families of dimerizing transcription factors.  The word "basic" does not refer to complexity but to the chemistry of the motif because transcription factors in general contain basic amino acid residues in order to facilitate DNA binding.

bHLH transcription factors are often important in development or cell activity. For one, BMAL1-Clock (also called ARNTL) is a core transcription complex in the molecular circadian clock. Other genes, like c-Myc and HIF-1, have been linked to cancer due to their effects on cell growth and metabolism.

Structure 

The motif is characterized by two α-helices connected by a loop. In general, transcription factors (including this type) are dimeric, each with one helix containing basic amino acid residues that facilitate DNA binding. In general, one helix is smaller, and due to the flexibility of this loop, allows dimerization by folding and packing against another helix. The larger helix typically contains the DNA-binding regions. bHLH proteins typically bind to a consensus sequence called an E-box, CANNTG. The canonical E-box is CACGTG (palindromic), however some bHLH transcription factors, notably those of the bHLH-PAS family, bind to related non-palindromic sequences, which are similar to the E-box. bHLH TFs may homodimerize or heterodimerize with other bHLH TFs and form a large variety of dimers, each one with specific functions.

Examples 
A phylogenetic analysis suggested that bHLH proteins fall into 6 major groups, indicated by letters A through F.  Examples of transcription factors containing a bHLH include:

Group A 
 MyoD
 Myf5
 Beta2/NeuroD1
 Scl, also known as Tal1
 Neurogenins

Group B 
 MAX
 C-Myc, N-Myc
 TCF4 (Transcription Factor 4)

Group C 
These proteins contain two additional PAS domains after the bHLH domain.

 AhR
 BMAL-1-CLOCK
 HIF
 NPAS1, NPAS3, MOP5

Group D 
 EMC

Group E 
 HEY1 and HEY2

Group F 
These proteins contain an additional COE domain
 EBF1

Regulation 

Since many bHLH transcription factors are heterodimeric, their activity is often highly regulated by the dimerization of the subunits. One subunit's expression or availability is often controlled, whereas the other subunit is constitutively expressed. Many of the known regulatory proteins, such as the Drosophila extramacrochaetae protein, have the helix-loop-helix structure but lack the basic region, making them unable to bind to DNA on their own. They are, however, able to form heterodimers with proteins that have the bHLH structure, and inactivate their abilities as transcription factors.

History 

 1989: Murre et al. showed that dimers of various bHLH proteins bind to a short DNA motif (later called E-Box). This E-box consists of the DNA sequence CANNTG, where N can be any nucleotide.
 1994: Harrison's and Pabo's groups crystallize bHLH proteins bound to E-boxes, demonstrating that the parallel 4-helix bundle motif loop orients the basic sequences to interact with specific nucleotides in the major groove of the E-box.
 1994: Wharton et al. identified asymmetric E-boxes bound by a subset of bHLH proteins with PAS domains (bHLH-PAS proteins), including Single-minded (Sim) and the aromatic hydrocarbon receptor.
 1995: Semenza's group identifies hypoxia-inducible factor (HIF) as a bHLH-PAS heterodimer that binds a related asymmetric E-box.
 2009: Grove, De Masi et al., identified novel short DNA motifs, bound by a subset of bHLH proteins, which they defined as "E-box-like sequences". These are in the form of CAYRMK, where Y stands for C or T, R is A or G, M is A or C and K is G or T.

Human proteins with helix–loop–helix DNA-binding domain
AHR;       AHRR;      ARNT;      ARNT2;     ARNTL;     ARNTL2;    ASCL1;     ASCL2;
ASCL3;     ASCL4;     ATOH1;     ATOH7;     ATOH8;     BHLHB2;    BHLHB3;    BHLHB4;
BHLHB5;    BHLHB8;    CLOCK;     EPAS1;     FERD3L;    FIGLA;     HAND1;     HAND2;
HES1;      HES2;      HES3;      HES4;      HES5;      HES6;      HES7;      HEY1;
HEY2;      HIF1A;     ID1;       ID2;       ID3;       ID4;       KIAA2018;  LYL1;
MASH1;     MATH2;     MAX;       MESP1;     MESP2;     MIST1;     MITF;      MLX;       MLXIP;
MLXIPL;    MNT;       MSC;       MSGN1;     MXD1;      MXD3;      MXD4;      MXI1;
MYC;       MYCL1;     MYCL2;     MYCN;      MYF5;      MYF6;      MYOD1;     MYOG;
NCOA1;     NCOA3;     NEUROD1;   NEUROD2;   NEUROD4;   NEUROD6;   NEUROG1;   NEUROG2;
NEUROG3;   NHLH1;     NHLH2;     NPAS1;     NPAS2;     NPAS3;    NPAS4;    OAF1;      OLIG1;
OLIG2;     OLIG3;     PTF1A;     SCL;       SCXB;      SIM1;      SIM2;      SOHLH1;
SOHLH2;    SREBF1;    SREBF2;    TAL1;      TAL2;      TCF12;     TCF15;     TCF21;
TCF3;      TCF4;      TCFL5;     TFAP4;     TFE3;      TFEB;      TFEC;      TWIST1;
TWIST2;    USF1;      USF2;

See also 
 Basic helix-loop-helix leucine zipper transcription factors

References

External links 
 PDOC00038 in PROSITE
 
bHLH family  at PlantTFDB:Plant Transcription Factor Database

Protein domains
Protein structural motifs
DNA-binding substances